St. George's Episcopal Church is a historic Episcopal church in Griffin, Spalding County, Georgia. It was added to the National Register of Historic Places on April 7, 1994. It is located at 132 North Tenth Street.

Construction of the church was delayed by the American Civil War and the American Reconstruction period. A lot for the church was bought on the corner of Tenth Street and Broad Street in 1868. In November 1869 the church's cornerstone was placed with the Bishop of Georgia officiating and services were held in April 1871. A rectory was built a few years later (now administration offices) and in 1921 the Grantland Memorial Parish Hall was built. In 1962 the Education Wing was added and the original rectory remodeled. In May 1975 a sacristy was added for the Altar Guild. The church merged with St. Stephen's Episcopal Church, which served the African Americans, and the altar, pews and baptismal font from St. Stephen's were dedicated in 2003. A Children's chapel was also added. St. George's sesquicentennial celebration was held in 2014.

See also
National Register of Historic Places listings in Spalding County, Georgia

References

Buildings and structures in Griffin, Georgia
Episcopal church buildings in Georgia (U.S. state)
Churches completed in 1871
Gothic Revival church buildings in Georgia (U.S. state)